Let's Count Goats! is a 2010 children's picture book by Mem Fox and illustrated by Jan Thomas. It is a counting book with the narrator inviting the reader to count goats that appear in the pictures as they engage in humanlike behaviour.

Reception
In a review of Let's Count Goats!, School Library Journal wrote "Fox and Thomas draw viewers in through catchy phrases and amusing pictures of goats that appear in a variety of shapes, sizes, and numbers", and called it "a clever counting lesson".

Let's Count Goats! has also been reviewed by Kirkus Reviews, Publishers Weekly, Booklist, Horn Book Guides, and Magpies.

References

External links

 Library holdings of Let's Count Goats!

Australian picture books
2010 children's books
Picture books by Mem Fox
Mathematics fiction books